Quincy Township is a township in Franklin County, Pennsylvania. The population was 5,318 at the 2020 census, a decline from the figure of 5,541 tabulated in 2010.

The township has the name of John Quincy Adams, sixth President of the United States.

Geography
The township is in southeastern Franklin County, bordered to the east by Adams County. The borough of Mont Alto is surrounded by the northern part of the township but is a separate municipality. The Appalachian Trail traverses the eastern side of the township.

Pennsylvania Route 997 crosses the center of the township, leading north through Mont Alto to Scotland, and south to Waynesboro. Pennsylvania Route 316 passes through the western part of the township, leading north to Chambersburg, the county seat, and south to Waynesboro. Pennsylvania Route 233 runs east from Mont Alto through the northern part of the township, passing Mont Alto State Park and leading north into Guilford Township and then to Caledonia State Park.

The unincorporated community of Old Forge is in the southeastern part of the township, where the East Branch of Antietam Creek emerges from South Mountain. Other unincorporated communities include Quincy, which lies along PA 997 between Mont Alto and Waynesboro, and South Mountain, in the northeast corner of the township and home of the South Mountain Restoration Center.

Neighboring Townships

  Antrim Township (west)
  Guilford Township (north)
  Hamiltonban Township (Adams County), (east)
  Washington Township (south)

Communities

  Altenwald
  Biesecker Gap
  Elbrook
  Fairview
  Five Forks
  Fox Hill
  Jugtown
  Knepper
  Nicodemus
  Nunnery
  Old Forge
  Quinsonia
  Quincy
  South Mountain
  Tomstown

Demographics

As of the census of 2000, there were 5,846 people, 1,816 households, and 1,416 families residing in the township.  The population density was 130.9 people per square mile (50.6/km).  There were 1,917 housing units at an average density of 42.9/sq mi (16.6/km).  The racial makeup of the township was 95.84% White, 2.22% African American, 0.12% Native American, 0.48% Asian, 0.02% Pacific Islander, 0.68% from other races, and 0.63% from two or more races. Hispanic or Latino of any race were 1.18% of the population.

There were 1,816 households, out of which 30.8% had children under the age of 18 living with them, 66.7% were married couples living together, 6.9% had a female householder with no husband present, and 22.0% were non-families. 18.9% of all households were made up of individuals, and 10.8% had someone living alone who was 65 years of age or older.  The average household size was 2.67 and the average family size was 3.02.

In the township the population was spread out, with 23.3% under the age of 18, 13.9% from 18 to 24, 22.9% from 25 to 44, 20.4% from 45 to 64, and 19.6% who were 65 years of age or older.  The median age was 37 years. For every 100 females, there were 100.1 males.  For every 100 females age 18 and over, there were 90.9 males.

The median income for a household in the township was $41,214, and the median income for a family was $47,350. Males had a median income of $30,451 versus $23,663 for females. The per capita income for the township was $16,816.  About 4.2% of families and 8.5% of the population were below the poverty line, including 13.1% of those under age 18 and 10.3% of those age 65 or over.

References

External links
Quincy Township official website

Populated places established in 1733
Townships in Franklin County, Pennsylvania
Townships in Pennsylvania